The appeal to novelty (also called appeal to modernity or argumentum ad novitatem) is a fallacy in which one prematurely claims that an idea or proposal is correct or superior, exclusively because it is new and modern. In a controversy between status quo and new inventions, an appeal to novelty argument is not in itself a valid argument. The fallacy may take two forms: overestimating the new and modern, prematurely and without investigation assuming it to be best-case, or underestimating status quo, prematurely and without investigation assuming it to be worst-case.

Investigation may prove these claims to be true, but it is a fallacy to prematurely conclude this only from the general claim that all novelty is good.

Chronological snobbery is a form of appeal to novelty, in which one argues that the only relevant knowledge and practices are those established in the last decades. The opposite of an appeal to novelty is an appeal to tradition, in which one argues that the "old ways" are always superior to new ideas.

Appeals to novelty are often successful in a modern world where everyone is eager to be on the "cutting edge" of technology. The dot-com bubble of the early 2000s could easily be interpreted as a sign of the dangers of naïvely embracing new ideas without first viewing them with a critical eye. Also, advertisers frequently extoll the newness of their products as a reason to buy.  Conversely, this is satirised as bleeding edge technology by skeptics (this may itself be an example of the appeal to tradition fallacy).

Explanation
The appeal to novelty is based on the reasoning that in general people will tend to try to improve the outputs resulting from their efforts. Thus, for example, a company producing a product might be assumed to know about existing flaws and to be seeking to correct them in a future revision. This line of reasoning is obviously flawed for many reasons, most notably that it ignores:
 motive (a new product may be released that is functionally identical to previous products but which is cheaper to produce, or with modifications that have nothing to do with its core use, e.g. aesthetic modifications on a technological product);
 cyclicality (the fashion industry continually rediscovers old styles and markets them as the next new thing);
 population dynamics (the previous product may have been created by an expert who has since been replaced by a neophyte);
 fallibility (while building the new product defects or negative side effects can be introduced undetected, effectively rendering it inferior);
 difference between local and general improvement (a new product may be superior to its previous counterpart in its core function but made lacking in other aspects, leading to a general inferior state, e.g. a product dropping some features, or becoming restricted geographically);
 cost (the new product may be better in terms of performance but have low or no return on investment if used to replace the older one).

Examples 
 "If you want to lose weight, your best bet is to follow the latest diet."
 "The department will become more profitable because it has been reorganized."
 "Upgrading all your software to the most recent versions will make your system more reliable."
 "Things are bad with party A in charge, thus party B will bring an improvement if they're elected."
 "If you want to make friends, you have to wear the latest fashion and the trendiest gadgets."
 "Do X because it is (current year)."

Appeal to novelty fallacy: designation pitfalls
In some cases, there may exist one or more unnamed – but still universally acknowledged – correlations between novelty and positive traits. For example, newer technology has a tendency to be more complex and advanced than older. A correlation may, for example, exist between the newness of a virus definition file and the security of a computer, or between the newness of a computer and its speed and performance. In these precise cases, something may be more likely to be superior whenever it is new and modern, though not exclusively because it is new and modern. In some restricted cases, it may even be proven. Thus, what may seem like Appeal to novelty is not a fallacy in every case. It is only a fallacy if the invoked correlations are disputed if no correlation has been examined, or if the correlations are claimed as proofs.

Whenever something undergoes some sort of continuous decay, valuing novelty is justified as long as novelty restores some status quo with an anterior state (or improves on it). For instance, new clothes are arguably superior to their identical worn out counterparts, as are newly produced body parts to the old in the case of moulting. Much the same way, in aesthetics, for example in some arts and music, the value can be held not by the actual product or its performance, but rather by the sentiment of freshness and amazement that it causes; for example, many radio stations play only that music which is currently selling well (or is predicted to sell well following its imminent release), not that which has sold equally well only a few months before. The implication is that it is the currency of the popularity that confers value, rather than any intrinsic quality of the music itself, or of popularity at previous times. If it is the case, a novelty in itself – though not necessarily all forms of novelty – is a key aspect of evaluation. In those cases, if a statement comparing two art forms does mention their respective states of novelty, there is no fallacy (e.g. "Song A is currently a much better bet for your party than song B.").

See also
Historian's fallacy
Myth of progress
Shiny object syndrome

References 

Novelty
Genetic fallacies